Tipperary North may refer to:
 North Tipperary, a former county in Ireland
 Tipperary North (Dáil constituency), a former parliamentary constituency represented in Dáil Éireann
 Tipperary North (UK Parliament constituency), a UK Parliament constituency in Ireland